Üzümçülər is a village in the Zangilan Rayon of Azerbaijan.

Populated places in Zangilan District